Progress M-49, identified by NASA as Progress 14P, was a Progress spacecraft used to resupply the International Space Station. It was a Progress-M 11F615A55 spacecraft, with the serial number 249.

Launch
Progress M-49 was launched by a Soyuz-U carrier rocket from Site 1/5 at the Baikonur Cosmodrome. Launch occurred at 12:34:23 UTC on 25 May 2004.

Docking
The spacecraft docked with the aft port of the Zvezda module at 13:54:43 UTC on 27 May. It remained docked for 64 days before undocking at 06:04:48 UTC on 30 July 2004 to make way for Progress M-50. It was deorbited at 10:37:00 GMT on the same day. The spacecraft burned up in the atmosphere over the Pacific Ocean, with any remaining debris landing in the ocean at around 11:23:35 UTC.

Progress M-49 carried supplies to the International Space Station, including food, water and oxygen for the crew and equipment for conducting scientific research.

See also

 List of Progress flights
 Uncrewed spaceflights to the International Space Station
 Progress M-17M

References

Spacecraft launched in 2004
Progress (spacecraft) missions
Spacecraft which reentered in 2004
Supply vehicles for the International Space Station
Spacecraft launched by Soyuz-U rockets